The Midwest Conference men's basketball tournament is the annual conference basketball championship tournament for the NCAA Division III Midwest Conference. The tournament has been held annually since 1991. It is a single-elimination tournament and seeding is based on regular season records.

As conference champion, the winner receives the Midwest's automatic bid to the NCAA Men's Division III Basketball Championship.

Results

Finals champion only
Championship game results incomplete, 1991–2001

Full results

Championship records
Results incomplete for 1991–2001

 Schools highlighted in pink are former members of the league
 Knox has not yet qualified for the tournament finals
 Coe never qualified for the finals as league members

References

NCAA Division III men's basketball conference tournaments
Tournament
Recurring sporting events established in 1991